Berkeley Square Historic District may refer to:

Berkeley Square Historic District (Trenton, New Jersey), listed on the National Register of Historic Places in Mercer County, New Jersey
Berkeley Square Historic District (Saranac Lake, New York), listed on the National Register of Historic Places in Franklin County, New York